Ernest (Methuen) Mancoba (29 August 1904 – 25 October 2002) was an avant-garde artist, born in Transvaal Colony, who spent the majority of his life in Europe. He was probably South Africa's first professional Black modern artist, and exhibited from the late 1920s onward.

Biography

Early life 
Ernest Methuen Mancoba was born in Turffontein, Johannesburg, Transvaal Colony on 29 August 1904. Born the son of a miner, Mancoba grew up on the Rand and was eventually sent to Grace Dieu near Pietersburg for his secondary schooling by his uncle, an Anglican minister. After graduating, he was hired at Grace Dieu as a language teacher in 1924.

Career and Early Education (Pre-Exile) 

Mancoba's interest in art began in 1925 with the arrival of an adjunct teacher named Ned Paterson at Grace Dieu. Paterson, a recent art school graduate preparing for the ministry, introduced wood carving and gained a following among those at Grace Dieu who were artistically inclined. Initially Mancoba produced decorated pieces of furniture in the school carpentry shop, using the school's bas relief style. In 1929, he tried his hand at freestanding sculpture, and produced a commissioned work called African Madonna using a model in a contrapposto stance. African Madonna is probably the first modern sculpture produced by a Black South African, and is now on permanent display at the Johannesburg Art Gallery.  In 1934, Mancoba sculpted Future Africa (Africa to be)—two youthful African figures as a representational appearance of Africa's bright future. Two years later, Mancoba was offered a job by the South African government's Department of Native Affairs during the spring of 1936 to craft purchasable souvenirs for the Empire Exhibition in Johannesburg later that fall. He initially considered, but eventually refused. Along with other Grace Dieu carvers, Mancoba began exhibiting at the South African Academy annual competitions. By this point he and his friend Gerard Sekoto began to dream of attending art school in Europe, for which they needed a B.A. After leaving Grace Dieu to attend the South African Native College at Fort Hare on scholarship, he quit carving for several years. When his funds ran out, he dropped out of Fort Hare and survived by producing religious sculptures on commission, operating out of the Rhodes University Art Department. In 1935 he decided to pursue art full-time and moved to Cape Town, where he associated with a group of Trotskyite artists, including Lippy Lipshitz, who had a strong impact on his emerging sculpture style. In 1937, Grace Dieu rehired Mancoba to teach English at an affiliate, Khaiso Secondary School in Pietersburg. The goal was for Mancoba to earn a living while completing received his undergraduate degree from the University of South Africa by correspondence. With encouragement from Gerard Sekoto, Mancoba succeeded. Mancoba took up woodcarving, which he would specialize in until moving to France in 1938. He left South Africa for Europe in 1938 when he received a scholarship to continue his studies in Paris, where he enrolled at the École nationale supérieure des arts décoratifs.

Career and Introduction to Abstraction (Post-Exile) 

Once in Europe, Mancoba continued his expedition in art; visiting art museums and attending exhibitions. When viewing other African art in European museums, he was given a new perspective—including his very own work. In his sculpture "Future Africa", the two figures appear dismayed and hopeless, with dispirited eyes and their heads lowered. Although the “sad” representational impact in his sculpture wasn't his primary goal; Mancoba understood that due to Africa's long struggle of breaking free from western colonialism, African art was perceived in European museums as “primitive” and dismal. In an effort to ascend pass the western perception of African art, Mancoba pursued painting abstraction.

An excerpt from the thoughts Ernest Mancoba read as “People there could hardly understand it, that a black man could have had anything to do in the place, and, even less, that he should have been asking for such a recently known French author. But I argued and finally had the opportunity to sit down and read the book, which they kindly brought me. While absorbing what I found in it, which astonished me very much, I began to think about how enriching it would be to have an exchange of ideas with such an open mind, who spoke with such deep respect about the expression of Africans, when I wasn’t even considered as a full human being in my own country”.

Mancoba consciously abandoned the religious artistic tradition he had started out in and permanently transitioned from sculpture to painting.
His first painting, Composition (1940), figuratively modernizes a Congolese Kuba mask by merging colorful geometrical shapes and sections that reestablish the human form in a profound new configuration created by appropriating figural and design aspects from the African canon. Mancoba’s Composition and other paintings he did in Paris demonstrate his familiarity and ease with contemporary European modernist styles and aesthetics. Many in the field of modern African art recognize and respect his importance as one of, if not the first black African modernist. A quote from (Hassan, Salah, p.g. 19) “This Oguibe illustrates by showing the turning points in Mancoba’s work and by tracing what he understands to be the sensibilities underlying those turns, that is, “from a concern for the mere liturgical within European traditions to an interest in the mechanics and syntax of African sculpture and eventually a personal resolution of the divergent historical trajectories that constitute a colonial or postcolonial modernity, including expatriation and nostalgia.” This, he argues, made Mancoba arrive at a stage of resolution analogous to the emergence of modern individualism in African consciousness”. This quote argues in such Mancoba’s accomplishment lies in his courageous cut off from the expectations and persistence of being a South African artists and truly becoming a free artists; similar to his european contemporaries, wished to explore the limits of artistic expression despite colonial restrictions 
His increasing interest in abstraction has been interpreted by Elizabeth Morton as a conscious attempt to negate the paternalistic approach to art he had learned as an Anglican student.  As Morton notes, Mancoba was one of the few mission-trained African artists "to have consciously eliminated all traces of his mission style from his work." Mancoba was interviewed about his piece "Faith. 1936. Wood” which was originally posted in “The Star, June 8th 1936” in the popular source "MOMA, Museum for Modern Art". “For a time he was what I can only call passionately absorbed in the primitive art of his people, the carved stools, the figures of fighters, of great tribe-leaders, of women and children. “Look,” he said to me, “they are all serene. Do you know why? My carvings are made to show Africa to the white man. That is why they are sad. These primitive artists were working for the preservation of group-life. The artists, with the chiefs and priests, are the great leaders of the world. In Africa they carved figures strong and beautiful and free because 
. While in Paris he met fellow student Sonja Ferlov. In 1940, shortly after Germany occupied France during WWII, Mancoba stayed in Paris along with Sonja Ferlov during Germany's western front. Despite being under curfew and German control, they later married in 1942.

Taken as a British subject, Mancoba interned while in a POW camp until 1944. Allied forces, accompanied by U.S. troops, pushed German forces out of France and ended the war in 1945. In 1946, they had a son named Wonga (1946–2015) who would also become a respected artist.

In 1947, Mancoba moved with Ferlov to a small town village outside of Copenhagen. There she introduced Mancoba to Asger Jorn who was a part of the Host Artist's Association and a founding member of Cobra. For the next annual exhibition (1948), Asger Jorn invited Mancoba and Ferlov to attend and meet two other Cobra artists; Constant Nievwenhuys and Corneille Guillaume Beverloo (most commonly known under his pseudonym Corneille). The exhibition came to be known by art historians to be the first Cobra exhibition since the CobrA manifesto had been written and signed several days before. The Stedelijk Museum in Amsterdam hosted Constant and Corneille's Cobra exhibition called the “Exposition Internationale d’ Art Experimental, in 1949. Constant and Corneille invited seven other Danish Artist, including Mancoba who did not participate. Due to his absence, Mancoba wasn't listed within the exhibition's catalogue and perhaps resulted in his exclusion from the list of Cobra artists. Although no known reason stands for Mancoba and why he didn't participate, personal complications between members may have had an impact on his involvement with the group. Although Mancoba was an active participant with Cobra members and in later artistic movements, his role received little attention in art historical scholarship. Leading artist and scholar Rasheed Araeen to argue in 2004 that the erasure of Mancoba was the result of racism and ethnocentrism.

In the 1950s, Mancoba returned to Paris, where he became a French citizen. In 1957, Mancoba painted "Untitled 1957". An oil on canvas painting bearing bold colors and energetic gestures of demanding lines. He sought transparency in his painting process while depicting a freedom of expression through abstraction. Ernest Mancoba's style is composed of line movement often encompassing a central figure-like form that dissolves into the surrounding abstract atmosphere of colorful oils, charcoal, ink or pastel marks. In the late 1980s and until his passing, Mancoba shifted his format to landscape and strayed from one central figure to many calligraphic strokes with various mediums. He died near Paris in 2002, aged 98.

Exhibitions 
In the source presented by Södertälje Konsthall, we are given a legacy exhibition of Ernest Mancoba, consisting of conversation between Joanna Sandell, director, Södertälje konsthall and Alicia Knock, curator Centre Pompidou. Ernest Mancoba personifies an artist’s legacy that searches for clarity around the human condition. He does this through his use of movement in form and colour, in drawings, paintings and sculptures. Mancoba is described as a carful and focused artist with a deep relationship towards researching man’s juxtaposition here on earth. Mancoba was not afraid of debating Europe’s one sided relationship to Africa and its artforms, and created his own breakthrough of modernism within art. In the exhibition there is a smaller museum for the works of Ernest Mancoba from the Danish collections of the Ernest Mancoba Sonja Ferlov Estate in Denmark as well as Museum Jorn Silkeborg.

References

Sources
“Identity and Abstraction: Ernest Mancoba in London and Paris, 1938- 1940.” Post, 9 May 2018, https://post.moma.org/identity-and-abstraction-ernest-mancoba-in-london-and-paris-1938-1940/.
Obrist, Hans Ulrich. “An Interview with Ernest Mancoba.” Third Text, vol. 24, no. 3, May 2010, pp. 373–84. Taylor and Francis+NEJM, https://doi.org/10.1080/09528821003799544.
Obrist, Hans Ulrich. “An Interview with Ernest Mancoba.” Third Text, vol. 24, no. 3, May 2010, pp. 373–84. Taylor and Francis+NEJM, https://doi.org/10.1080/09528821003799544.
Södertälje Konsthall — Ernest Mancoba . https://www.sodertaljekonsthall.se/en/exhibitions/ernest-mancoba/. Accessed 26 Oct. 2021.<
Hassan, Salah M. “African Modernism: Beyond Alternative Modernities Discourse.” South Atlantic Quarterly, vol. 109, no. 3, July 2010, pp. 451–73. Silverchair, https://doi.org/10.1215/00382876-2010-001.

External links
 Themba ka Mathe, "The artist who died far from home".

1904 births
2002 deaths
Abstract painters
20th-century South African painters
20th-century male artists
South African male painters
South African expatriates in France